Sanar-e Olya (also Romanized as Sanār-e ‘Olyā; also known as Sanār-e Bālā) is a village in Birun Bashm Rural District, Kelardasht District, Chalus County, Mazandaran Province, Iran. At the 2006 census, its population was 76, in 21 families.

References 

Populated places in Chalus County